Vlaardingen West is a metro station in Vlaardingen, the Netherlands. Located on the Hoekse Lijn, it is served by RET Metro Line B at all times, and Line A during peak periods.

History

The station was opened on 1 June 1969 by Nederlandse Spoorwegen, as a local railway station on the Hoekse Lijn.  NS stopped operating the line, including Vlaardingen West railway station, on 1 April 2017 to enable conversion for metro train operations. The station was reopened by RET on 30 September 2019, with preview services operating on 28 September.

Metro services
As of 2019, Vlaardingen West is served by 6 trains per hour on RET Metro Line B, of which 3 per hour travel the full length of the route, and 3 travel only as far as Steendijkpolder

During peak periods, the station is also the western terminus of Line A, with 6 trains per hour making use of the centre track and platform to turn back eastbound.

Bus services
Bus services are operated by RET.

56 Vlaardingen West - Holy Noord

References

External links
 Dutch Public Transport journey planner

Rotterdam Metro stations
Railway stations opened in 1969
Railway stations on the Hoekse Lijn
Vlaardingen